

Adolf Bartels (15 November 1862 – 7 March 1945) was a pastor, German journalist and poet.  Known for his völkisch worldview, he has been seen as a harbinger of Nazi anti-Semitism.

Bartels was born at Wesselburen, in Holstein, and educated at Leipzig and Berlin.  An artisan's son, Bartels studied literature.  After 1895 a free-lance journalist in Weimar, he gained a reputation as a Hebbel scholar.  In 1897 he wrote a history of German literature that was marked by racist evaluations and rabid antisemitism; it became a pioneering work for National Socialist literary reviews.  According to Bartels, even authors whose names sounded Jewish, who wrote for the "Jewish press", or who were friendly with Jews were "contaminated with Jewishness".  The noblest task of völkisch cultural policy would therefore be a radical de-Jewing of the arts, and thus the "salvation of National Socialist Germany" (1924). Bartels led a successful campaign to prevent the unveiling of a statue of Heinrich Heine in 1906. After World War One, Bartels' work experienced an upsurge in popularity, with his followers forming the Bartelsbund (Bartels Society) to promote his ideas; the Bartelsbund later merged with
Erich Ludendorff's Tannenbergbund group. Bartels' work achieved "quasi-official" status in Nazi Germany, and Hitler personally awarded Bartels the Adlerschild medal, Nazi Germany's highest civilian honour, in 1937.

Bartels died in Weimar on 7 March 1945.  Bartels's further literary productions included Die Dithmarscher (1898), a historical novel based on his native region advocating ruralism, which sold over 200,000 copies by 
the 1920s, and Martin Luther (1903).

Works

Poetic and dramatic works
 Gedichte (1889)
 Dichterleben (1890)
 Aus der meerumschlungenen Heimat (1895)
 Der dumme Teufel, a mock epic (1896)
 Martin Luther, a trilogy (1903)

Criticism and literary history
 Friedrich Gessler (1892)
 Die deutsche Dichtung der Gegenwart (1897)
 Geschichte der deutschen Litteratur (two volumes, 1901-02)
 Adolf Stern (1905)
 Heinrich Heine (1906)
 Gerhart Hauptmann (1906)
 Deutsche Literatur. Einsichten und Aussichten (1907)
 Deutsches Schrifttum (1911)

Notes

References
 Fuller, Steven Nyole. Nazis' Literary Grandfather: Adolf Bartels and Cultural Extremism, 1871-1945, Peter Lang Pub Inc, 1996.
 Rees, Philip. Biographical Dictionary of the Extreme Right Since 1890, 1991,.
 Christian Zentner, Friedemann Bedürftig (1991). The Encyclopedia of the Third Reich''.  Macmillan, New York.

External links
 

1862 births
1945 deaths
People from Wesselburen
People from the Duchy of Holstein
Nazi Party members
German poets
Writers from Schleswig-Holstein
German male journalists
German journalists
German male poets